Walter Nicolás Otta (born 12 December 1973) is an Argentine retired footballer striker and currently the manager of Atlético de Rafaela.

Career 
Otta is a classic example of the international journeyman footballer, and has played for 14 different teams in 11 different countries.

Otta was born in Río Tercero, Córdoba, and started his career with Villa Dálmine in the lower leagues of Argentine football in 1993. In 1996, he moved to Chile to play for  Puerto Montt and then Deportivo Temuco. Between 1998 and 1999 he played for  Walsall at the third level of English football. In 1999, he joined Xerez CD in Spain. 2000 saw him play at Marathón in Honduras and in 2001 he played for Blooming of Bolivia. Between 2001 and 2003 he played in Portugal with C.D. Nacional and then C.F. União. He played in Peru with Universidad San Martín and then for Manta Fútbol Club in Ecuador. In 2004, he joined Calgary Mustangs in Canada before signing for Fortuna Düsseldorf in Germany. In 2005, he returned to Argentina and Villa Dálmine before moving to Sportivo Barracas in 2007. Otta joined in January 2008 to Fénix and retired in the winter of 2009.

Coaching career
Otta started his coaching career in September 2010, becoming manager of his former club Villa Dálmine. He was in charge until the end of 2013, also achieving promotion to Primera B Metropolitana, before he left the club to become manager of Club Atlético Acassuso. He left the club in August 2015 and one month later became manager of Unión de Mar del Plata. He managed the team until the end of the year and then became manager of Deportivo Morón. Under Otta, the club had one of its best periods in the club history, but meanwhile, Otta decided to resign after a defeat on 19 October 2018. One week later, his return to Villa Dálmine was announced. He resigned on 8 May 2019.

On 22 May 2019, he became manager of Atlético de Rafaela.

References

External links
 Walter Otta at BDFA.com.ar 
  Ultimate Saddlers A-Z: page 13

1973 births
Living people
Sportspeople from Córdoba Province, Argentina
Argentine footballers
Association football forwards
Villa Dálmine footballers
Puerto Montt footballers
Deportes Temuco footballers
Walsall F.C. players
Xerez CD footballers
C.D. Marathón players
Club Blooming players
C.D. Nacional players
C.F. União players
Club Deportivo Universidad de San Martín de Porres players
Calgary Mustangs (USL) players
Fortuna Düsseldorf players
Sportivo Barracas players
Club Atlético Fénix players
English Football League players
Liga Nacional de Fútbol Profesional de Honduras players
Argentine expatriate sportspeople in Chile
Argentine expatriate sportspeople in Germany
Argentine expatriate sportspeople in Spain
Argentine expatriate sportspeople in Bolivia
Argentine expatriate sportspeople in Canada
Argentine expatriate sportspeople in Ecuador
Argentine expatriate sportspeople in Peru
Expatriate footballers in Bolivia
Expatriate footballers in Chile
Expatriate footballers in Germany
Expatriate footballers in Honduras
Expatriate footballers in Peru
Expatriate footballers in Spain
Expatriate soccer players in Canada
Argentine expatriate sportspeople in Honduras